Omar Alam (born 7 March 1985) is an Indian cricketer who plays for Jammu & Kashmir. He made his Twenty20 debut on 6 January 2016 in the 2015–16 Syed Mushtaq Ali Trophy.

References

External links
 

1985 births
Living people
Indian cricketers
Jammu and Kashmir cricketers
People from Srinagar